In linear algebra, a pentadiagonal matrix is a special case of band matrices.
Its only nonzero entries are on the main diagonal, and the first two upper and two lower diagonals. 
So it is of the form   

It follows that a pentadiagonal matrix has at most  nonzero entries, where n is the size of the matrix. Hence, pentadiagonal matrices are sparse, making them useful in numerical analysis.

See also
 Tridiagonal matrix
 Heptadiagonal matrix

Sparse matrices